To a Finland Station is an album by trumpeters Dizzy Gillespie and Arturo Sandoval recorded in 1982 and released on the Pablo label. Dizzy visited Finland 1982 to do a concert with the Finnish Studio Orchestra. By coincidence a Cuban group, led by Arturo Sandoval , was also appearing in Helsinki. Predictably, Dizzy got together with Arturo and in one all-night session that extended into the next morning, recorded this album

Reception
The Allmusic review stated "this recording is of great historic value".

Track listing
All compositions by Dizzy Gillespie
 "Wheatleigh Hall" - 8:12 
 "First Chance" - 6:12 
 "And Then She Stopped" - 9:17 
 "Rimsky" - 8:44 
 "Dizzy the Duck" - 12:07

Personnel
Dizzy Gillespie - trumpet, Jew's harp
Arturo Sandoval - trumpet
Esko Linnavalli - piano
Pekka Sarmanto - bass
Esko Rosnell - drums

References 

1983 albums
Pablo Records albums
Dizzy Gillespie albums
Arturo Sandoval albums